Pechet is a surname, likely of early French origin. Notable people with the surname include:

Business and industry
 Eugene Pechet (1917–2008), Canadian hotel owner and banker
 Howard Pechet, hotel, casino, restaurant owner and theater producer
 Nikki Pechet, Co-founder & CEO of Homebound, and Board of Director of Thrivent Financial
 Tamin Pechet, CEO of Upwell, and founder of Imagine H2O

Medicine and science
 Maurice Pechet (1918–2012), American scientist, Internal medicine physician, entrepreneur and philanthropist
 Liberto Pechet (1926–2015), American hematologist and hematopathologist, educator, researcher and co-author
 Taine Pechet, American thoracic surgeon

Sports
 Mitch Pechet (1918–2009), Canadian NHL and USHL hockey player

Television and film
 Kim Pechet, writer and narrator for Shimmy (TV series)

References

French-language surnames
Lists of people by surname